The 1978–79 season was the 77th in the history of the Western Football League.

The league champions for the first time in their history were Frome Town. The champions of Division One were newcomers A.F.C. Bournemouth Reserves.

Premier Division
The Premier Division was increased from eighteen clubs to twenty after St Luke's College disbanded, and three clubs joined:

Clandown, runners-up in the First Division.
Ilminster Town, third-placed club in the First Division.
Keynsham Town, champions of the First Division.
Mangotsfield United were officially known as Mangotsfield PF for this season only, for sponsorship reasons.

League table

First Division
The First Division remained at nineteen clubs after Clandown, Ilminster Town and Keynsham Town were promoted to the Premier Division. Three new clubs joined:

A.F.C. Bournemouth Reserves
Elmore, from the South Western League.
Wellington

League table

References

1978-79
5